Richard Dean ("Dick") Himes,  "Ox" Himes, (born May 25, 1946 in Canton, Ohio) was a National Football League offensive lineman from 1968 through 1977 for the Green Bay Packers.

1946 births
Living people
Players of American football from Canton, Ohio
American football offensive linemen
Ohio State Buckeyes football players
Green Bay Packers players